The Guaranteed Rate Bowl is an annual college football bowl game that has been played in the state of Arizona since 1989.

Played as the Copper Bowl from inception through 1996, it was known as the Insight.com Bowl from 1997 through 2001, then the Insight Bowl from 2002 through 2011, the Buffalo Wild Wings Bowl for 2012 and 2013, and the Cactus Bowl for the 2014 through 2017 seasons. In 2018 and 2019, the game was known as the Cheez-It Bowl. In 2020, Guaranteed Rate signed on as the title sponsor of the game, renaming it as the Guaranteed Rate Bowl.

When the bowl was initially founded, it was played at Arizona Stadium in Tucson, on the campus of the University of Arizona. In 2000, the organizers moved the game from Tucson to Phoenix. There, it was played at what is now known as Chase Field, the home of the Arizona Diamondbacks of Major League Baseball. For the 2006 season, the bowl moved a second time. After the annual Fiesta Bowl left Sun Devil Stadium in Tempe in favor of playing in University of Phoenix Stadium in Glendale, the bowl (then still known as the Insight Bowl) was relocated there as a permanent replacement. The bowl returned to its previous home of Chase Field in Phoenix for the January 2016 playing, due to renovation work at Sun Devil Stadium that was expected to last at least three off-seasons. The bowl has remained at Chase Field through the December 2021 season, making it one of four active bowl games staged in baseball-specific stadiums, the other three being the Pinstripe Bowl at Yankee Stadium, the Fenway Bowl at Fenway Park, and the Holiday Bowl at Petco Park.

The 2020 edition of the bowl was cancelled on December 20, 2020, due to an insufficient number of teams being available to fill all 2020–21 bowl games, following a season impacted by the COVID-19 pandemic.

History
"Cactus Bowl" had been the originally planned name for what became the Copper Bowl in 1989. The game was played under the Copper Bowl name through 1996, after which title sponsorship rights were assumed by Insight Enterprises, which self-titled the game from 1997 through 2011. In 2012, restaurant chain Buffalo Wild Wings became the sponsor and self-titled the game for two years. Buffalo Wild Wings declined to renew sponsorship following the 2013 game, at which time organizers opted to rename the game "Cactus Bowl" rather than reverting to the Copper Bowl name. There had been a Texas-based Cactus Bowl played in Division II, but that game was discontinued after 2011.  For 2014, TicketCity sponsored the new Cactus Bowl, and Motel 6 became the sponsor in 2015. In 2018, Kellogg's became the sponsor and rebranded the bowl, naming it after its cheese cracker brand, Cheez-It. In May 2020, the Cactus Bowl name returned, as Cheez-It sponsorship moved to what had been known as the Camping World Bowl played in Orlando, Florida.

For the first ten years, the game was played at Arizona Stadium, on the campus of the University of Arizona in Tucson. In 2000, the bowl's organizers moved the game to Bank One Ballpark, a baseball-specific stadium, in downtown Phoenix. In 2006, the game moved to Sun Devil Stadium at Arizona State University in Tempe to replace the Fiesta Bowl, which had moved to University of Phoenix Stadium in the Phoenix suburb of Glendale. The 2006 game set a record (since tied in the 2016 Alamo Bowl) for the biggest comeback in NCAA Division I FBS bowl history, as Texas Tech came back from a 38–7 third-quarter deficit to defeat Minnesota in overtime, 44–41.

For the first three playings of the Copper Bowl, TBS carried the game. Beginning in 1992 and continuing until the 2005 playing, the game aired on ESPN. After a four-year hiatus, during which NFL Network carried the game, ESPN regained the rights beginning in 2010.

Conference tie-ins
Before 2006, the game mainly featured teams from the Pac-10, Western Athletic Conference, Big 12, and old Big East conferences. From 2006 to 2013, it began featuring an annual matchup between teams from the Big Ten and the Big 12.  Starting with the 2015 game, it featured a matchup between Pac-12 and Big 12 teams. Teams from the Atlantic Coast Conference and Mountain West Conference have also competed, along with teams from the now defunct Southwest Conference and Big Eight, and one independent school (Notre Dame in 2004). In July 2019, the bowl announced tie-ins with the Big Ten and Big 12 conferences, starting with the 2020–21 season and continuing through the 2025–26 season.

Game results
All rankings are taken from the AP Poll prior to the game being played.

Source:
Games  1–11 (copper) played in Tucson at Arizona Stadium
Games 12–17 (silver) played in Phoenix at Bank One Ballpark (now Chase Field)
Games 18–26 (yellow) played in Tempe at Sun Devil Stadium
Games 27–present (silver) played in Phoenix at Chase Field (formerly Bank One Ballpark)

MVPs
Two MVPs are selected for each game; one an offensive player, the other a defensive player.

Sportsmanship award
The bowl awarded a sportsmanship award for the 2001 through January 2016 games.

Most appearances

Updated through the December 2022 edition (33 games, 66 total appearances).

Teams with multiple appearances

Texas is the only current Big 12 school that has not played in this bowl.  Seven of the current Big 12 schools have appeared multiple times.  Former Big 12 members Colorado and Missouri have appeared in the bowl, but former Big 12 members Nebraska and Texas A&M have not.

Teams with a single appearance
Won (5): BYU, Colorado, Kansas, Michigan State, Syracuse

Lost (10): Boise State, Boston College, Michigan, New Mexico, North Carolina State, Notre Dame, Rutgers, UCLA, Virginia Tech, Washington

Appearances by conference
Updated through the December 2022 edition (33 games, 66 total appearances).

 Games marked with an asterisk (*) were played in January of the following calendar year.
 Records reflect conference affiliations at the time the game was played. For example, current Pac-12 member Colorado appeared as a member of the Big 12 in 1999.
 The Pac-12's record includes appearances when the conference was the Pac-10. From 1989 through 2005, Pac-10 teams made eight appearances and were 7–1.
 Big East teams made seven appearances and were 2–5; the American Athletic Conference (The American) retains the conference charter following the 2013 split of the original Big East along football lines.
 Conferences that are defunct or no longer active in FBS are marked in italics.
 Independent appearances: Notre Dame (2004)

Game records

Games marked with an asterisk (*) were played in January of the noted calendar year.

Source:

Media coverage
The bowl has been televised by three different networks: TBS (1989–1991), ESPN (1992–2005, 2010–present), and NFL Network (2006–2009).

References

External links
 

 
College football bowls
Recurring sporting events established in 1989